Rondine is the Italian word for swallow (a type of bird).

It can refer to:
La rondine, an opera by Puccini
Rondine (Arezzo), a hamlet in Arezzo
Rondine, four-cylinder engine developed by Gilera 
Corvette Rondine, a model of the Chevrolet Corvette (C2)
Rondine typeface produced by Nebiolo Printech